Kshetrarama Maha Vihara (also known as Kekirideniya Pansala) is a historic Buddhist temple situated in Moratuwa, Sri Lanka. The temple has been formally recognized by the Government as an archaeological site in Sri Lanka.

The temple

The Kshetrarama Temple at Lakshapathiya was established in 1829 by the chief monk, Ven. Weligama Sri Sumanatissa Thero. He resided at the Saranapala Maha Vihara in Walana during that period. Notable among the archaeological interests and monuments of the Vihara are the old Buddha shrine, the Seema Malakaya, and the Bhikkhu dwellings. The old image house, with a seated stone Buddha statue, gets special attention as it is a Kandyan era feature. However, its original appearance was altered as part of substantial renovation works which took place in 2012. The two-storeyed Seema Malakaya building of this temple appears to incorporate architectural features of the World War II period. It displays unique and rare features that aren't seen at any other Buddhist shrine in the country. This makes it a unique travel destination. The library of the temple stores many valuable ola leaf volumes containing the book of Tripiṭaka as well as other ancient volumes.

References

External links
The description board of the Kshetrarama Vihara, erected by Archaeological Department

Buddhist temples in Colombo District
Archaeological protected monuments in Colombo District